The Bruiser Brody Memorial Show was a professional wrestling supercard held by Giant Baba and All Japan Pro Wrestling as a tribute to wrestler Bruiser Brody at Budokan Hall in Tokyo, Japan on August 29, 1988. His wife and son were present at the event and his widow, Barbara Goodish, presented her late husband's chain to Stan Hansen so he could wear it in remembrance of Brody during his matches. The show received much attention from the Japanese press and, according to the Wrestling Observer, the media coverage "turned into almost an Elvis Presley type of thing as the magazines are still filled with Brody photos four weeks after his death and on Baba's show they mention his name dozens of times each hour". The show was attended by 16,300 fans and raised $70,000, most of which were donated to Brody's family.

Show results

Bruiser Brody Memorial
August 29, 1988 in Tokyo, Japan (Budokan Hall)

References

External links
Professional wrestling record for the AJPW Bruiser Brody Memorial from The Internet Wrestling Database
Bruiser Brody Memorial Show at WrestlingData.com

Professional wrestling memorial shows
1988 in professional wrestling
1988 in Japan
Events in Tokyo
August 1988 events in Asia
Professional wrestling in Tokyo